The Portland Winterhawks are a junior ice hockey team based in Portland, Oregon, playing in the Western Hockey League (WHL), one of three leagues making up the Canadian Hockey League (CHL). Prior to the 2021-22 season, the Winterhawks split their home games between the Veterans Memorial Coliseum and the Moda Center, which they shared with the Portland Trail Blazers of the National Basketball Association (NBA).

The Winterhawks are one of the most successful junior teams in terms of producing National Hockey League (NHL) alumni, a list that includes Sven Baertschi, Joe Morrow, Seth Jarvis, Ryan Johansen, Braydon Coburn, Adam Deadmarsh, Rob Klinkhammer, Brandon Dubinsky, Tyler Wotherspoon, Andrew Ference, Paul Gaustad, Jannik Hansen, Seth Jones, Brenden Morrow, Nino Niederreiter, Mike Vernon, Glen Wesley and Hall of Famers Mark Messier, Marian Hossa and Cam Neely.

The Winterhawks have won the Ed Chynoweth Cup three times and the Memorial Cup twice in five appearances. The team has been in Portland since 1976–77.

History

The Winterhawks were founded in 1950 as the Edmonton Oil Kings. The franchise moved to Portland on June 11, 1976. The team, owned by Brian C. Shaw, made the move citing a much cheaper stadium deal in Portland along with low attendance due to the presence of a professional team in Edmonton. In their first season in Portland, the club would lose 7–2 to a travelling Russian club in an exhibition match watched by more than 5,000. Following the relocation to Portland, the Winterhawks became the southernmost franchise in the Canadian Hockey League.

The Winterhawks were pioneers of promotion and are credited with the invention of the "Dash for Cash," in which contestants are picked to run onto the ice and try to scoop up as many silver dollars in two minutes as they can. This popular promotion has been running for many years. Moreover, in late November/early December, they hold their annual teddy bear toss, in which fans throw teddy bears on the ice at the first Portland goal, which are then donated to local children's charities. On December 6, 2008, fans threw out 22,392 teddy bears after Luke Walker scored Portland's first goal against the Seattle Thunderbirds.

Prior to their 2021 rebranding, the Winterhawks wore jerseys with a logo similar to those of the Chicago Blackhawks of the NHL, causing some to erroneously assume that the Winterhawks are a minor league farm team of the Blackhawks. In actuality, the jerseys originally worn by the first Winterhawks team were a used set of Chicago jerseys obtained through connections between the owners of the two teams. In early photos, the old Chicago jerseys are identifiable by the letter "C" with crossed tomahawks on the shoulder crest. The Winterhawks eventually changed the "C" to a "P".

The Portland-Chicago connection runs deeper, as the Blackhawks were founded in 1926 by Frederic McLaughlin, who simply bought the contracts of most of the members of the newly-defunct Portland Rosebuds of the folded Western Hockey League and brought them to Chicago.

In the 2009–10 season, the Winterhawks introduced an alternate "Hawk Eyes" logo as part of a new advertising campaign that featured lightning flashes on a mottled black background and the SMS-style words, "LOC8, NTMD8, DVST8" (read: "locate, intimidate, devastate"). In 2010–11, an alternate Hawk Head logo was added, with a similar design as the Blackhawks logo, but featuring only the three team colors: red, white and black. A new third jersey was also created with the Hawk Eyes on the front over stylized, mottled black fabric throughout; player names, numbers and accents are in gunmetal gray, and the new tri-color Hawk Head is featured as the shoulder patch.

On November 28, 2012, the WHL announced sanctions against the Winterhawks for a series of player benefits violations over the four previous seasons. As punishment for the violations WHL Commissioner Ron Robison suspended the team from participation in the first five rounds of the 2013 WHL Bantam Draft and forfeiture of their first round picks from the 2014 to 2017 WHL Bantam Drafts and were fined $200,000. The WHL also suspended General Manager and Head Coach Mike Johnston for the remainder of the 2012–13 season, including the 2013 WHL playoffs.

On May 12, 2013, the Winterhawks defeated the Edmonton Oil Kings 5–1 in Game 6 to become the 2012–13 WHL champions. On April 25, 2014, the Winterhawks defeated the Kelowna Rockets 7–3 to win their fourth-consecutive Western Conference Championship.

The franchise filed for Chapter 15 bankruptcy in May 2020 due to the COVID-19 pandemic in Portland, Oregon. The Winterhawks were financially stable, but owner Bill Gallacher had to sell the franchise in order to repay other debts.

Mascot

The team mascot of the Winterhawks is a white bird with multicolored tail and wing feathers, named Tom-A-Hawk. Tom-A-Hawk was introduced in 1999–2000. He wears jersey number 00. Tom-A-Hawk's main rival is Cool Bird of the Seattle Thunderbirds. Tom-A-Hawk announced in January 2019 that he would retire from injuries. A new mascot was introduced, Tommy.

Name change
The team was known as the Winter Hawks until May 2009, when it issued a press release that "the space...announced its retirement" and that the team was renaming itself the Winterhawks.

Logo change
On July 14, 2021, the Winterhawks announced their new identity and that they would be moving from the similar looking Chicago Blackhawks of the NHL logo, to a "Winterhawk". The Winterhawks organization partnered with local apparel company Portland Gear on the rebrand to help create the new primary logos, secondary logos, as well as the word marks.

Current ownership
The WHL Board of Governors has approved Winterhawks Sports Group (WSG) as the new owners of the Portland Winterhawks franchise effective January 1, 2021. WSG is led by Michael Kramer and Kerry Preete, who will also be the managing partners. Along with the Winterhawks franchise, WSG has also acquired the operations of the Winterhawks Skating Center in Beaverton, OR and all Winterhawks Junior Hockey programs.

Prior to the start of the 2021-22 WHL season, the Winterhawks ownership announced the team would be returning to the Veterans Memorial Coliseum full-time.

Announcers
The Portland Winterhawks have changed announcers 5 times since 1976. These include; Cliff Zauner (1976-1982), Dean "Scooter" Vrooman (1982-2007), Andy Kemper (2004-2018), Todd Vrooman (2007-2017), Evan Richardson (2017-2018), Nick Marek (2018–present).

Season-by-season record
Note: GP = Games played, W = Wins, L = Losses, T = Ties, OTL = Overtime losses, Pts = Points, GF = Goals for, GA = Goals against

Current roster
Updated January 13, 2023.

  

 
 

 

 
  

 
 
 
 

 
 

 

 

 

 

 
 

|}

Championships
Memorial Cup (2): 1982–83, 1997–98
President's Cup (3): 1981–82, 1997–98, 2012–13
Scotty Munro Memorial Trophy (4): 1979–80, 1997–98, 2012–13, 2019–20
Conference Champions (6): 1997–98, 2000–01, 2010–11, 2011–12, 2012–13, 2013–14
Division Playoff Champions (6): 1978–79, 1981–82, 1982–83, 1986–87, 1988–89, 1992–93
Regular Season Division Champions (13): 1977–78, 1978–79, 1979–80, 1981–82, 1982–83, 1988–89, 1992–93, 1996–97, 1997–98, 2001–02, 2010–11, 2012–13, 2013–14

WHL Championship history
1978–79: Loss, 2–4 vs Brandon
1981–82: Win, 4–1 vs Regina
1982-83: Loss, 1–4 vs Lethbridge
1986-87: Loss, 3–4 vs Medicine Hat
1988–89: Loss, 0–4 vs Swift Current
1992–93: Loss, 3–4 vs Swift Current
1997–98: Win, 4–0 vs Brandon
2000–01: Loss, 1–4 vs Red Deer
2010–11: Loss, 1–4 vs Kootenay
2011–12: Loss, 3–4 vs Edmonton
2012–13: Win, 4–2 vs Edmonton
2013–14: Loss, 3–4 vs Edmonton

Memorial Cup finals history
1983: Win, 8–3 vs Oshawa
1998: Win, 4–3 OT vs Guelph
2013: loss, 4–6 vs Halifax

Team records

During the 2012–13 season, Winterhawks captain Troy Rutkowski established the new team record for most regular games played as a Winterhawk. His career total of 351 games surpassed the previous mark of 328 games set by Kevin Haupt in the 1998–99 season.

NHL alumni
List of Portland Winterhawks alumni who have graduated to play in the National Hockey League.

 Jim Agnew
 Dave Archibald
 Dave Babych
 Wayne Babych
 Sven Baertschi
 Jozef Balej
 Jeff Bandura
 Dave Barr
 Ryan Bast
 Kieffer Bellows
 Brian Benning
 Jim Benning
 Oliver Bjorkstrand
 James Black
 Joachim Blichfeld
 Lonny Bohonos
 Keith Brown
 Dennis Cholowski
 Nick Cicek
 Braydon Coburn
 Ed Cooper
 Craig Cunningham
 Brian Curran
 Tony Currie
 Byron Dafoe
 Matt Davidson
 Adam Deadmarsh
 Chase De Leo
 Jim Dobson
 Brandon Dubinsky
 Matt Dumba
 Brent Fedyk
 Andrew Ference
 Ray Ferraro
 Jeff Finley
 Colin Forbes
 Michael Funk
 Joaquin Gage
 Paul Gaustad
 Rob Geale
 Cody Glass
 Josh Green
 Jannik Hansen
 Randy Heath
 Adin Hill
 Joel Hofer
 Marcel Hossa
 Marian Hossa
 Dave Hoyda
 Cale Hulse
 Jamie Huscroft
 Randy Ireland
 Brad Isbister
 Seth Jarvis
 Ryan Johansen
 Henri Jokiharju
 Caleb Jones
 Seth Jones
 Jakub Klepis
 Rob Klinkhammer
 Steve Konowalchuk
 John Kordic
 Richard Kromm
 Jason LaBarbera
 Scott Langkow
 James Latos
 Derek Laxdal
 Doug Lecuyer
 Taylor Leier
 Brendan Leipsic
 Jamie Linden
 David Mackey
 Clint Malarchuk
 Darrell May
 Jason McBain
 Frazer McLaren
 Cody McLeod
 Mark Messier
 Brendan Mikkelson
 Roy Mitchell
 Brenden Morrow
 Joe Morrow
 Paul Mulvey
 Brantt Myhres
 Cam Neely
 Scott Nichol
 Nino Niederreiter
 Gary Nylund
 Josh Olson
 Perry Pelensky
 Nic Petan
 Brent Peterson
 Jim Playfair
 Larry Playfair
 Andrej Podkonicky
 Ray Podloski
 Derrick Pouliot
 Nolan Pratt
 Ty Rattie
 Richie Regehr
 Florent Robidoux
 Jeff Rohlicek
 Grant Sasser
 Michael Sauer
 Luca Sbisa
 Dave Scatchard
 Colton Sceviour
 Jeff Sharples
 Brandon Smith
 Ryan Stewart
 Joey Tetarenko
 Mike Toal
 Tim Tookey
 Alfie Turcotte
 Dominic Turgeon
 Perry Turnbull
 Randy Turnbull
 Nick Vachon
 Mike Vernon
 Terry Virtue
 Mickey Volcan
 Gord Walker
 Matt Walker
 Blake Wesley
 Glen Wesley
 Jason Wiemer
 Dan Woodley
 Tyler Wotherspoon
 Gary Yaremchuk
 Ken Yaremchuk
 Brad Zavisha
 Richard Zednik

bold = member of the Hockey Hall of Fame

First round draft picks
Players chosen in the first round of the NHL Entry Draft:

References

External links

 Portland Winterhawks official homepage

 
Western Hockey League teams
Ice hockey clubs established in 1976
Winterhawks
1976 establishments in Oregon
Ice hockey teams in Oregon